Admiral Sir Charles Edward Kennedy-Purvis  (2 May 1884 – 26 May 1946) was a Royal Navy officer who went on to be Deputy First Sea Lord.

Naval career
He was the son of Captain Charles Kennedy-Purvis, who lost a leg during the Egypt campaign. Kennedy-Purvis entered the navy as a cadet in January 1899 aboard the training ship Britannia at Dartmouth. He became a midshipman on 15 May 1900, and was promoted to acting-sub-lieutenant on 15 July 1903, being confirmed in that rank on 11 January 1905. He was soon promoted again, to lieutenant on 1 July 1905, backdated to 15 January 1904.

Kennedy-Purvis became one of the Navy's early wireless telegraphy specialists, and after promotion to commander in June 1915 was appointed an instructor at the newly formed RN Signal School. He served as the executive officer of the cruiser  in 1918–1919, and of the battleship  in 1919–1920, then returned to the Signal School as its commander, having been promoted to captain in December 1921. He later served in the Admiralty's Signal Division, and commanded the cruiser  in 1925, and the cruiser  in 1925–1926, before being appointed Director of the Signal Division in 1927.

From March 1931 Kennedy-Purvis commanded , soon after her conversion into an aircraft carrier, as part of the Mediterranean Fleet. He served as a Naval Aide-de-camp to the King from January 1933, was made a CB in April 1933, and promoted to rear admiral in September. In June 1935 he was appointed to the Board of Admiralty as an Assistant Chief of the Naval Staff with special responsibility for Fleet Air Arm affairs.

Between 1936 and 1938 he commanded the 1st Cruiser Squadron in the Mediterranean, receiving promotion to vice admiral on 28 June 1937. In 1939 he became the President of the Royal Naval College, Greenwich and Vice-Admiral Commanding the War College, and was awarded the KCB.

In March 1940 he was appointed Commander-in-Chief of the America and West Indies Station, and on 15 February 1942 was promoted to admiral. His time as C-in-C coincided with the Destroyers for Bases Agreement in which fifty elderly destroyers were transferred from the United States to the UK in return for the right of the U.S. Navy and Air Forces to establish bases in British territories. In the West Indies Kennedy-Purvis successfully surmounted any difficulties and within a very short time was working in closest co-operation with his American counterpart.

In late 1942 he was recalled to England to become the Deputy First Sea Lord, an appointment created to relieve the First Sea Lord Admiral of the Fleet Sir Dudley Pound of the burden of his administrative duties, allowing him to concentrate on his role as Chief of the Naval Staff and a member of the Chiefs of Staff Committee. After Pound's resignation in September 1943 he served under Admiral of the Fleet Sir Andrew Cunningham.

After the war, Kennedy-Purvis was awarded the GBE, and was made a Commander of the Legion of Merit by the United States. Ill-health compelled him to retire in March 1946, and he died of a heart attack at his home on 26 May 1946. His funeral service was held at the Royal Naval College Chapel in Greenwich.

Personal life
He married May Conquest in 1910, but had no children. Lady Kennedy-Purvis died in 1971.

References

External links
 
 

|-

1884 births
1946 deaths
Royal Navy admirals of World War II
Lords of the Admiralty
Commanders of the Legion of Merit
Admiral presidents of the Royal Naval College, Greenwich
Bermuda in World War II
Admiralty personnel of World War II